Georg Vogelsang (1883–1952) was a German stage and film actor. He specialised in Bavarian character parts.

Selected filmography
 The Secret of Castle Elmshoh (1925)
 Three Fathers for Anna (1939)
 The Eternal Spring (1940)
 The Vulture Wally (1940)
 Quax the Crash Pilot (1941)
 Sky Hounds (1942)
 The War of the Oxen (1943)
 Gabriele Dambrone (1943)
 The Eternal Tone (1943)
 Die Feuerzangenbowle (1944)
 The Wedding Hotel (1944)
 Orient Express (1944)
 Via Mala (1945)
 Quax in Africa (1947)
 Royal Children (1950)
 King for One Night (1950)
 Who Is This That I Love? (1950)
 The Last Shot (1951)
 One Night's Intoxication (1951)
 Border Post 58 (1951)
 Heimat Bells (1952)
 Two People (1952)

References

Bibliography 
 Giesen, Rolf. Nazi Propaganda Films: A History and Filmography. McFarland & Company, 2003.

External links 
 

Male actors from Munich
1883 births
1952 deaths
German male film actors
German male stage actors